The President Pro Tempore of the Union of South American Nations is the head position and representative of the Union of South American Nations (UNASUR). At international meetings,  declarations and concerted opinions of the supranational organism are presented by the President Pro Tempore. The office is exercised for a one-year period on a pro tempore basis by one of the heads of state of each UNASUR Member State, the succession following alphabetical order. The most recent president was the President of Bolivia, Evo Morales, who served, as acknowledged by unasursg.org, between 17 April 2018 and 16 April 2019.

The attributions of the President Pro Tempore are:

To organize, invite members, and preside over UNASUR meetings, present to the Council of Ministers of Foreign Affairs the annual plan of activities of UNASUR and the meetings agenda, in coordination with the Secretary General, represent UNASUR in international meetings, with the approval of the Member States and sign declarations and agreements with third parties, after approval from the pertaining UNASUR institutions.

The presidency pro tempore directs the eight ministerial councils of UNASUR: South American Council of Health, South American Council of Social Development, South American Council of Infrastructure and Planning, South American Council of Education, Culture, Science, Technology and Innovation; South American Council of Fight against the South American Narcotráfico, Council of Defense South American, South American Council of Economy and Finances, and South American Council.

List of presidents pro tempore

References

2008 establishments in South America